Bruce Alan Kleiner is an American mathematician, working in differential geometry and topology and geometric group theory.

He received his Ph.D. in 1990 from the University of California, Berkeley.  His advisor was Wu-Yi Hsiang. Kleiner is a professor of mathematics at New York University.

Kleiner has written expository papers on the Ricci flow. Together with John Lott of the University of Michigan, he filled in details of Grigori Perelman's proof of the Geometrization conjecture (from which the Poincaré conjecture follows) in the years 2003–2006. Theirs was the first publication acknowledging Perelman's accomplishment (in May, 2006), which was shortly followed by similar papers by Huai-Dong Cao and Xi-Ping Zhu (in June) and John Morgan and Gang Tian (in July).

Kleiner found a relatively simple proof of Gromov's theorem on groups of polynomial growth. He also proved the Cartan–Hadamard conjecture in dimension 3.

References
Citations

Bibliography

External links

 Home page at NYU

20th-century American mathematicians
21st-century American mathematicians
Geometers
Living people
Topologists
Yale University faculty
Courant Institute of Mathematical Sciences faculty
University of California, Berkeley alumni
University of Michigan faculty
Year of birth missing (living people)